Citicorp Railmark Inc. (trading as Citirail Express)  is a company that leases locomotives to railroads as needed. The company is a subsidiary of Citibank, which itself is a division of Citigroup. It was formerly  known as Citicorp Aerolease, and was first formed on May 13th, 1970.

Locomotives 
Citirail currently has 167 locomotives, which are listed here:

References

External links 
 Photos of CREX locomotives

Rolling stock leasing companies
Railway companies established in 1970